Greatest Hits is the first compilation album by American country music singer John Anderson. It was released under Warner Bros. Records in 1984. The album includes singles from Anderson's first albums for Warner Bros., and among its cuts are the number one singles "Swingin'", "Black Sheep" and "Wild and Blue".

Track listing

Chart performance

References

John Anderson (musician) albums
Warner Records compilation albums
1984 greatest hits albums
albums produced by Norro Wilson